The Southbank is a neighborhood of Jacksonville, Florida, considered part of the Urban Core.

Location
Southbank is located along the St. Johns River, south of the Downtown Core, and immediately north of San Marco. It is roughly bounded by the river to the north and west, Bishop Kenny High School to the east, and Interstate 95 to the south.

Transportation
Southbank is served by the Jacksonville Transportation Authority's Skyway, an extensive bus network and the Jacksonville Water Taxi.

Current Skyway Stations in Southbank
 San Marco near the Acosta Bridge on San Marco Blvd. It serves the Museum of Science and History, Baptist Medical Center, and the Prudential Building.
 Riverplace on Flagler Ave services Riverplace Tower.
 Kings Avenue at Kings Ave & Prudential Dr and is the southern terminus of the Skyway

Attractions and characteristics

Southbank is a mixed-used district closely associated with Jacksonville's San Marco neighborhood. It includes large office and residential structures, such as the Aetna Building, The Peninsula, and Riverplace Tower.  Attractions such as the Museum of Science and History, Friendship Fountain and the Southbank Riverwalk can also be found in the district. The city hopes to better integrate it with the rest of Downtown as well as San Marco.

Neighborhood

References

 

History of Jacksonville, Florida
Neighborhoods in Jacksonville, Florida
Downtown Jacksonville
Southbank, Jacksonville